The 1993 FINA Men's Water Polo World Cup was the eighth edition of the event, organised by the world's governing body in aquatics, the International Swimming Federation (FINA). The event took place in Athens, Greece. Eight teams participated to decide the winner of what would be a bi-annual event until 1999.

Final ranking

References

1993
F
W
1993
Sports competitions in Athens